George E. Ansorge (August 22, 1880 – September 15, 1965) was a member of the Wisconsin State Assembly.

Biography
Ansorge was born on August 22, 1880, in Oconto, Wisconsin. During the Spanish–American War, he served in the United States Army. He died on September 15, 1965.

Political career
Ansorge was elected to the assembly in 1918. Previously, he was an Oconto alderman from 1906 to 1912. He was a Republican.

References

See also

People from Oconto, Wisconsin
Republican Party members of the Wisconsin State Assembly
Wisconsin city council members
Military personnel from Wisconsin
United States Army soldiers
American military personnel of the Spanish–American War
1880 births
1965 deaths
Burials in Wisconsin
20th-century American politicians